is a Japanese decathlete. He competed in the 400 m hurdles at the 2012 Summer Olympics, but was disqualified in the heats. At the 2016 Rio Games he placed 22nd in the decathlon. Nakamura won several medals on continental level in heptathlon and decathlon.

International competitions

References

External links 

 
 

1990 births
Living people
Sportspeople from Nagoya
Japanese male hurdlers
Japanese decathletes
Olympic male hurdlers
Olympic decathletes
Olympic athletes of Japan
Athletes (track and field) at the 2012 Summer Olympics
Athletes (track and field) at the 2016 Summer Olympics
Asian Games bronze medalists for Japan
Asian Games medalists in athletics (track and field)
Athletes (track and field) at the 2014 Asian Games
Athletes (track and field) at the 2018 Asian Games
Medalists at the 2014 Asian Games
Medalists at the 2018 Asian Games
World Athletics Championships athletes for Japan
Asian Athletics Championships winners
Asian Indoor Athletics Championships winners
Japan Championships in Athletics winners
20th-century Japanese people
21st-century Japanese people